The Meiji Yasuda J.League KONAMI Monthly MVP is an association football award that recognises the best player each month of the season in the J1 League, J2 League, and J3 League.

The first awards were given in the 2013 season to J1 League and J2 League players. The J3 League was created in 2014, but they weren't included in the awards until the 2019 season.

The winners are chosen by a selection committee currently made up of a mix of J.League officials, commentators and some members of the media. A selection committee meeting is held each month where the members cast their votes for the winners of the MVP award. The winners receive prize money (J1: 300,000 yen, J2: 200,000 yen, J3: 100,000 yen) and their award is presented on the player's first home game following the announcement.

It has been previously known as the Coca-Cola J.League Monthly MVP (2013-2014), Meiji Yasuda J.League Coca-Cola Monthly MVP (2015), Meiji Yasuda J.League Monthly MVP (2016), Meiji Yasuda J.League Mastercard priceless japan Monthly MVP (2017–2018); since the 2019 season, it has been known as the Meiji Yasuda J.League KONAMI Monthly MVP.

Takashi Usami has been named Monthly MVP the most, winning 5 awards across both the J1 and J2 League. No player has ever won consecutive J1 or J3 League awards, but three players have won consecutive J2 League awards: Akihiro Ienaga, Jong Tae-se and Leonardo. Jong won three J2 MVP awards in the 2016 season and Koki Ogawa achieved the same in the 2022 season – the most of any players in a single season across all three leagues.

J1 League

List of winners

Multiple winners

Awards won by nationality

Awards won by club

J2 League

List of winners

Multiple winners

Awards won by nationality

Awards won by club

J3 League

List of winners

Multiple winners

Awards won by nationality

Awards won by club

References

External links

MVP of the month
J.League trophies and awards
Association football player non-biographical articles